Zoe Ness (born 24 March 1996) is a Scottish footballer, who played as a forward for Rangers in the Scottish Women's Premier League.

Club career
Ness was born in Durham just after her parents had moved there for work. She came through the youth ranks at Durham Cestria before signing a senior deal with Durham in 2014 as the team entered the FA WSL 2 for the first time.

Ness made 20 appearances across all competitions in Durham's debut season before securing a move to Sweden with Damallsvenskan team Mallbackens IF. She scored three goals in the team's final five league games to help them avoid relegation.

After two seasons in Sweden, Ness made a return to Durham ahead of the FA WSL Spring Series in 2017. In July 2019, Ness announced she was ending her second spell at Durham.

In August 2019, Ness subsequently signed for fellow Championship side Lewes.

Ness signed for Rangers in February 2020.

International
Despite being born in England, Ness is eligible to represent Scotland because both her parents are Scottish. She has played at under-15, under-17 and under-19 level as well as for the senior team.

In 2014, Ness traveled to Norway to compete in the 2014 UEFA Women's Under-19 Championship with Scotland, scoring in a Group Stage win over Belgium.

Ness was first called up to the senior team for a friendly against Sweden in January 2016 but didn't make her debut for a further two years during a friendly against New Zealand at La Manga on 3 March 2018, before playing a second friendly against the same opposition three days later. Ness scored her first senior international goal on 10 April 2018 in a 2019 FIFA Women's World Cup qualifier against Poland.

International goals 

 As of match played 5 April 2019. Scotland score listed first, score column indicates score after each Ness goal.

References

External links 
 

1996 births
Living people
Scottish women's footballers
Mallbackens IF players
Damallsvenskan players
Scottish expatriate women's footballers
Scottish expatriate sportspeople in Sweden
Expatriate women's footballers in Sweden
Women's association football forwards
Scotland women's international footballers
Durham W.F.C. players
FA Women's National League players
Lewes F.C. Women players
Rangers W.F.C. players
Sportspeople from Durham, England
English women's footballers
Footballers from County Durham
English people of Scottish descent